Presidential elections were held in Cuba on 1 November 1928. The non-democratic elections were won by incumbent President Gerardo Machado who was the only candidate.

References

Cuba
Presidential elections in Cuba
Presidential election
Cuba
Election and referendum articles with incomplete results